Boksitogorsk is a town and the administrative center of Boksitogorsky District in Leningrad Oblast, Russia, located on the banks of the Pyardomlya River in the basin of the Syas River,  east of St. Petersburg. Population:

History
The settlement of Boksity was established in 1929 to house the workers of the local bauxite mine. It was a part of Tikhvinsky District of Leningrad Oblast. In December 1934, the construction of a bauxite plant started. In 1935, the settlement was granted urban-type settlement status and given its present name. In 1940, the population neared 10,000 and a school, kindergarten, nursery, ambulatory and drugstore, several canteens, and shops were built. In 1950, Boksitogorsk was granted town status and on July 25, 1952 it became the administrative center of Boksitogorsky District.

Administrative and municipal status
Within the framework of administrative divisions, Boksitogorsk serves as the administrative center of Boksitogorsky District. As an administrative division, it is, together with ten rural localities, incorporated within Boksitogorsky District as Boksitogorskoye Settlement Municipal Formation. As a municipal division, Boksitogorskoye Settlement Municipal Formation is incorporated within Boksitogorsky Municipal District as Boksitogorskoye Urban Settlement.

Demographics
Population: 

The town population reached its peak in 1979, at 23,200 people. Like much of Russia, the population of Boksitogorsk has gradually decreased since the 1980s. The ethnic composition of the town's population is primarily Russian.

Economy

Industry
Several manufacturing enterprises are located in Boksitogorsk, including the aluminum metallurgy plant, which is one of the daughter companies of Rusal, as well as producers of reinforced concrete, alcohol, food, and milk. Companies extracting peat and producing plastic ware also operate out of Boksitogorsk.

Transportation
Autoroute H-3 Dymi–Boksitogorsk–Bochevo runs across the town.

Autoroute A-114 Issad–Pikalyovo–Vologda runs  to the north of Boksitogorsk.

A local line connects Bolshoy Dvor railway station on the St. Petersburg–Vologda railway line with Boksitogorsk. However, currently there is no passenger service. Domestic flights onboard An-2 and Yak-12 craft to Leningrad and Tikhvin were serviced from the local airfield between the 1960s and 1980s. 

Public transport includes several town, suburb, and inter-town bus routes operated by local transport companies.

Culture and recreation
Boksitogorsk contains one cultural heritage monument classified as cultural and historical heritage of local significance. This is the cinema building.

Twin towns and sister cities

Boksitogorsk is twinned with:
 Kiukainen (consolidated in 2009 with Eura), Finland (current status unknown)
 Harjavalta, Finland
 Nakkila, Finland

References

Notes

Sources

External links
Official website of Boksitogorsk 
Boksitogorsk Business Directory 

Cities and towns in Leningrad Oblast
Cities and towns built in the Soviet Union
Boksitogorsky District